The 2006 Bank of Ireland All-Ireland Senior Football Championship began on Sunday 7 May 2006. The 2006 championship used the same "Qualifier" system that was used in 2005. Tyrone were the defending champions, but were knocked out relatively early in the competition by Laois. Kerry won their 34th Sam Maguire beating Mayo in a repeat of the 2004 final.

Format
Since the introduction of the so-called "back-door" system a few years ago, a number of changes have taken place in the championship format. In 2006 the following system was used:

The provincial championships in Munster, Leinster, Ulster and Connacht ran as usual on a "knock-out" basis.  These provincial games were then followed by the "Qualifier" system:
Round 1 of the qualifiers included all the counties (except New York) that did not qualify for the Provincial Semi-finals. An open draw was held to give eight pairings.
Round 2 consisted of the eight defeated teams in the Provincial Semi-finals playing against the eight winners from Round 1. A draw was held to determine the eight pairings.
Round 3 consisted of the eight winners from Round 2. Another open draw was held to determine the four pairings.
Round 4 consisted of each of the four teams defeated in the Provincial Finals playing against the four winners from Round 3. A draw was held to determine the four pairings.

The All-Ireland Quarter-finals: Each of the four Provincial Champions played one of the four winners from Round 4. The All-Ireland Semi-finals were on a Provincial rots basis, initially determined by the Central Council. If a Provincial Championship winning team was defeated in its Quarter-final, the team that defeats it would take its place in the Semi-final.

Results

Munster Senior Football Championship

Quarter-finals

Semi-finals

Final

Leinster Senior Football Championship

Round 1

Quarter-finals

Semi-finals

Final

Ulster Senior Football Championship

Round 1

Quarter-finals

Semi-finals

Final

Connacht Senior Football Championship

Quarter-finals

Semi-finals

Final

All-Ireland qualifiers

Round 1
This Round included all the counties that did not qualify for their respective Provincial Semi-finals. An Open Draw was held to give eight pairings, the winners progressed to Round 2 and the losers were eliminated from the 2006 All-Ireland Football Championship, but could continue in the All-Ireland competition, the Tommy Murphy Cup. Due to a controversial blood substitution by Offaly against Kildare, Kildare decided to appeal the match result and therefore Offaly's continuation in the Leinster Championship. Eventually it was clarified that Offaly hadn't broken the substitution rules, Kildare then faced Cavan in the first round of the qualifiers and subsequently defeated them. Round one saw the exit of Antrim, Down, Waterford, London, Carlow, Louth, Cavan and Wicklow from the 2006 All-Ireland Senior Football Championship. All-Ireland Football Champions Tyrone were forced to a replay against Louth but Tyrone came out as winners in the end.

Round 2
The eight winners of the first round qualifiers were paired with the eight losers in the All-Ireland Provincial Semi-finals. Round 2 saw the exit of Kildare, Roscommon, Limerick, Tipperary, Clare, Monaghan, Leitrim and 2005 All-Ireland Champions Tyrone.

Round 3
Round three consisted of the eight winners from Round two. Another open draw was held with the eight winners to determine the four pairings. The teams taking part in the third round were: Laois, Wexford, Meath, Fermanagh, Sligo, Westmeath, Longford and Derry.

Round 4
Round 4 consisted of each of the four teams defeated in the Provincial Finals playing against the four winners from Round 3. Donegal were paired with their Ulster rivals Fermanagh, and Leinster finalists Offaly were paired with local rivals Laois. Kerry met surprise fourth round qualifiers Longford and Galway met Westmeath.

All-Ireland series

Quarter-finals

Semi-finals

Final

All-Ireland Football Final

Championship statistics

Miscellaneous

 Galway vs Sligo delayed by 6 days due to bad weather.
 Mayo vs London back after being cancelled due to Foot and Mouth outbreak in 2001.
 Wexford had their first championship win over Meath since 1981.
 Armagh become the first county to win a triple of Ulster titles since Down (1959-1961).
 The Ulster final was played at Croke Park, Dublin for the last time until 2021. 
 Dublin vs Offaly Leinster final for the first time since 1983.
 In the old system there would have been a Cork vs Armagh All Ireland semi-final.

Top scorers

All-Ireland Senior Football Championship